

Incumbents
President: Michelle Bachelet (Socialist) (left office on March 11), Sebastián Piñera (RN) (took office on March 11)

Events
January 15–18: Pope Francisco's visit to Chile.
February 3: Santiago EPrix is a race in the forest Park circuit in the 2017–18 season of the formula E.
March 11: Change of Presidential command, Michelle Bachelet delivered the presidency of the country to Sebastián Piñera for the period between March 11, 2018 and March 11, 2022.

Music

Concerts
January 14: Placido Domingo (Chile in My Heart)
February 21: Queens of the Stone Age
May 25: Harry Styles
July 4: Niall Horan

Deaths

January 1: Manuel Rojas del Rio, lawyer and politician
January 12: Roberto Avendaño, actor
January 23:
Nicanor Parra, writer, mathematician and physicist
Marcelo Romo, actor
April 16: Alejandro Rojas Wainer, academic

References

 
2010s in Chile
Years of the 21st century in Chile
Chile
Chile